Rodney Coombes (born 15 May 1946) is an English musician. He was mostly known from playing drums with British bands Stealers Wheel in 1972 to 1973 and again in 2008 and Strawbs from 1974 to 1977 and again from 2004 to 2010.

Career
He has played drums professionally since he was 17, when he joined singer Lulu's backing band The Luvvers. He played with the Jeff Beck Group at the time of the release of the single "Hi Ho Silver Lining" and then joined soul band Trifle, with whom he stayed for about 18 months. He moved on to raunchy blues rock band Juicy Lucy before joining Stealers Wheel for their eponymous first album (which spawned the million seller "Stuck in the Middle With You"). In 1973, he left the increasingly dysfunctional band and joined Strawbs, with whom he stayed until after the release of the 1977 album Burning for You.

After spending some time on the studio side learning to engineer and produce, he lived in Malaysia for a period, returning to obtain his master's degree. He rejoined The Strawbs in 1998 for their 30th anniversary concert at Chiswick House and played on subsequent tours in the US, Canada, UK and Europe. Rod also works with his jazz group 'Ming Hat' and with Mark Horwood (The Mummers) and bassist Matt Gray in the fusion group E.V.A. Rod and Yardbirds guitarist Top Topham are working on a blues-jazz Hammond organ trio project.

From 2005 to 2007 he mentored and taught Curt Lawrence, ex-Last Letter Read, who went on tour with MC Lars in England. Curt attributes his hard hitting style and double kick drum technique to Coombes' tuition. Coombes can also play guitar and bass guitar. He played some bass for Stealers Wheel and some guitar for Strawbs. Coombes composed three tracks for Strawbs: "Sad Young Man", "A Mind of my Own" and "Changes Arrange Us", on which he also sang lead vocals.

Discography

Albums

Trifle
First Meeting (Dawn DNLS 3017, 1971)

Juicy Lucy
Lie Back and Enjoy It (1970)
Get a Whiff of This (1971)

Stealers Wheel
Stealers Wheel (1972)

John Entwistle (The Who)
Whistle Rymes (1972)

Strawbs
Hero and Heroine (1974)
Ghosts (1974)
Nomadness (1975)
Deep Cuts (1976)
Burning for You  (1977)
Blue Angel (2003)
Déjà Fou (2004)
The Broken Hearted Bride (2008)
Dancing to the Devil's Beat (2009)

Ming Hat
Jam-ming (jazz) Gash Recordings 2002

Singles
Unless otherwise stated, the details are of the singles released in the UK.

Lulu
"Shout!" (1964)

Jeff Beck
"Hi Ho Silver Lining" (1967)

Trifle
"All Together Now" / "Got My Thing" (United Artists UA 2270, 1969)
"Old Fashioned Prayer Meeting" / "Dirty Old Town" (Dawn DNS 1008, 1970)

Stealers Wheel
"Stuck in the Middle with You" (1972)

Strawbs
"Shine on Silver Sun"/"And Wherefore" (1973)
"Hero and Heroine"/"Why" (1974)
"Hold on to Me (The Winter Long)"/"Where do You Go" (1974)
"Round and Round"/"Heroine's Theme" (1974) (US and Italy only)
"Grace Darling"/"Changes Arranges" (1974)
"Angel Wine"/"Grace Darling" (1975) (Japan only)
"Lemon Pie"/"Don't Try to Change Me" (1975)
"Little Sleepy" (1975) (US and Portugal only)
"I Only Want My Love to Grow in You"/"Wasting My Time (Thinking of You)" (1976)
"So Close and Yet So Far Away"/"The Soldier's Tale" (1976) (US only)
"Charmer"/"Beside the Rio Grande" (1976)
"Back in the Old Routine"/"Burning for You" (1977)
"Keep on Trying"/"Simple Visions" (1977)
"Heartbreaker" (1977) (US and South Africa only)
"Joey and Me"/"Deadly Nightshade" (1978)
"New Beginnings"/"Words of Wisdom" (1978)
"I Don't Want to Talk About It"/"The Last Resort" (1978) (US only)

External links
Strawbs website
Rod Coombes at Strawbsweb

1946 births
Living people
English rock drummers
English male singer-songwriters
People from Notting Hill
Strawbs members